"As for One Day" (Azu fō Wan Dei) is the eighteenth single of J-pop idol group Morning Musume and was released April 23, 2003. It sold a total of 129,893 copies. This single also marked the graduation of second generation member Kei Yasuda. This was the last single to hit #1 until 2006's "Aruiteru". The first pressing comes with a sticker.

Members at the time of single 
1st generation: Kaori Iida, Natsumi Abe
2nd generation: Kei Yasuda , Mari Yaguchi
4th generation: Rika Ishikawa, Hitomi Yoshizawa, Nozomi Tsuji, Ai Kago
5th generation: Ai Takahashi, Asami Konno, Makoto Ogawa, Risa Niigaki

Track listing

CD 
 "As for One Day"
 "Never Forget" (Rock Version)
 "As for One Day" (Instrumental)

Single V DVD 
 "As for One Day"

References

External links 
"As for One Day" entries on the Up-Front Works official website: CD entry, DVD entry
Projecthello.com lyrics: As for One Day, Never Forget (Rock Version)

Morning Musume songs
Zetima Records singles
2003 singles
Oricon Weekly number-one singles
Songs written by Tsunku
Song recordings produced by Tsunku
Japanese-language songs
Torch songs
Pop ballads
2000s ballads
2003 songs